Holworthy Gate, also known as the 1876 Gate, is a gate on the Harvard University campus in Cambridge, Massachusetts. It is named after English merchant Matthew Holworthy. An inscription on the gate reads, "In Memory of Dear Old Times."

References

External links
 

Gates
Harvard University